Shri Tridandi Swami (22 April 1905 – 2 December 1999) was a renowned Sri Vaishnava saint and one of the foremost preachers of the Sri Vaishnava Sampradaya in North India. One of the foremost disciples of Sri Prativadibhayankar Swamiji of Kanchi, he popularized Sri Vaishnavism throughout North India among the masses and brought Sri Vaishnavism beyond its traditional domain of South India. After Sri Rangadeshika Swamiji, who founded the Ranganathji temple in the mid-19th century, he can rightly be counted amongst the most noteworthy Acharyas of Sri Vaishnava sampradaya.

He was born on Baishakha Krishna Paksha third, Friday in Anuradha Nakshatra Vikram era 1962 (1905 A.D) in the Shishirgadh village, 12 km southward of the Buxar town in the state of Bihar. He descended in the lap of Shrimati Mahamanya Indira Devi, the virtuous wife of an immensely devout kanykubja Brahmin named Shrinarayan Chaturvedi.

Later life
He (who later on became Tridandi Swami) was a yogi (a contemplative saint) and a sage possessing true spiritual knowledge by birth. However, following the worldly order he went to Lakshmi Narayan Temple, Charitravan, Buxar for study. He stood first class first at the ‘Sahityacharya’ examination held in Buxar. After that he went to Ayodhya and engaged himself exclusively for the deep study of grammar and again he secured the first rank in the first class at the ‘Vyakarnacharya’ examination held there.

Initiation and education

The revered Tridandi Swamiji Maharaj adopted consecration in Vaishnavism from Shri 1008 Swami Ram Krishnacharya ji, the fifth head of the spiritual shrine named Lakshmi Narayan Temple situated in the Charitravan, Buxar. His spiritual preceptor assigned him a new name i.e. Vishwaksenacharya in place of his previous home name ‘Vaidya Nath Chaturvedi’. This very Vishwaksenacharya ji met Shri Kanchi Prativadi Bhayankar Mathadhishwar Gadi Anantacharya Swami who was a well reputed preceptor in every nook and corner of India in 1926 A.D.. Shri Gadi Swami was a great man endowed with astonishing talent. Swami Vishwaksenacharya was instantly overwhelmed to see Shri Gadi Swami ji and so he expressed his keen desire to become a recluse under his guidance. Shri Gadi Swami ji taught him several books containing the knowledge of Nyaya and Vishishtadvaita Vedanta Philosophy. He also made him well acquainted with the teachings of several esoteric scriptures and adept in the scriptural deliberation. After this Shri Gadi Swami became instrumental in making him adopt the Tridanda Sanyas ( Tridanda Asceticism ) from Shri Vadi Kesari Azhagiya Manavala Ramanuja Jeeyar Swami ji and then he (Shri Gadi Swami ji) accepted him as his disciple. Thereafter Shri Vishwaksenacharya ji became Tridandi Swami endowed with excessive dispassion. Now Shri Gadi Swami made him behold the omniscient and all pervading God Sriman Narayana in no time.

Since then Shri Tidandi Swami's Acharya Nishtha ( allegiance and loyalty to his preceptor ) and Bhagavat Priti ( love and devotion to God ) had become so deep that he started remaining in Bhava Samadhi (emotional trance) for 2-2, 3–3 ,15-15,21-21 days. Sometimes he wailed loudly, at times became unconscious to hear the transcendental conduct of God and His devotees. Every now and then he used to become oblivious to the external surroundings, inter alia, even of his saffron belongings and Kamandal (water pot – earthen or wooden used by ascetics). He was often seen sitting at secluded spots under trees with a view to beholding and realizing the Supreme God.Shri Tridandi Swami Ji was endowed with rare ability to usually memorise the contents of the book once he went through it. He was at home in "Ashtanga Yoga" and he remained in trance for 5 days together.

In the Siddhashram Buxar itself he started chanting the sacred ‘Narayana Mantra’ with utmost faith and devotion. He attained mastery over all the limbs of the eightfold yoga of Nathamuni and performed sadhana in famous centres of pilgrimage like Badrinath , Muktinath , Gangotri etc. By dint of this Yogic practice he acquired surprising supernatural powers. Owing to be spontaneous grace of the Lord he soon became an undisputed master of the ‘Ashtanga Yoga’ of Nathamuni and its limbs (Yam – Niyam-aasan – Pranayam – Pratyahar – Dharana -Dhyan – Samadhi ). Shortly thereafter, he kept himself fully absorbed in yogic meditation after which he used the siddhis(occult powers) attained thereby for the benefit of hapless souls.

Propagation of Sri Vaishnavism
The duration of his trance went on farther. He remained in extreme exaltation for five, seven and fifteen days continuously. Just for pulling on his physical body he started taking some unboiled cow-milk obtained in alms. Sometimes he took only a few fruits like mango, guava, etc. Observing the total renunciation and ascetic leaving and seeing characteristics of a great man of divine nature in Tridandi Swami ji people got highly attracted towards him. Now Shri Swami ji dwelt in a hut made of grass and straw. In the meantime, his spiritual guru (teacher) who had given him the Vaishnava initiation gave up his worldly body and reached the Supreme abode in the Uttarabhadra Nakshatra of the eleventh day of the dark fortnight of the month of Jyesth of the Vikram era 1998 (1941 A.D.). In accordance with the last wish of his divine preacher he had to manage the sixth throne of Shripati Peeth Shri Lakshmi Narayana Temple, Charitravan, Buxar. But as Shri Tridandi Swami ji was, in effect, a Paribrajak Sanyasi (wandering ascetic) and had taken a vow for propagating the devotion to God from village to village roaming throughout India, he entrusted the responsibility of managing the said Shripati Peeth on the shoulders of his most worthy and competent disciple Shri Swami Devanayakacharya. Besides, there was also a mutt named Shri Kosalesh Sadan belonging to the said Lakshmi Narayan Temple in Ayodhya. Shri Trindandi Swami entrusted the responsibility of managing this ‘mutt’ on the shoulders of his well capable disciple named Vedmartand Shri Rama Narayanacharya ji. After sometime he made his both disciples ‘pithadheesh’ (proprietors of the shrines). He also conferred on them the vows of Tridandi Sanyas (renunciation).

Death
Shri Tridandi swami ji died on Margshirsh Krishna Paksha tenth, Thursday in Utara Falguni Nakshtra Vikram era 2056 (1999 A.D). There is a beautiful temple where pujya Shri Tridandi swamiji died and people often visit there to get his blessings.

References
 Written By - Jagadguru Ramanujacharya Swami Rajnarayanacharya Ji Maharaj, Bhakti vatika, Deoria (Uttar Pradesh)
referenced book Shri Tridandi Dev Smirithi Granth, Shri Swami Charitra Manjari and from inspiration of Shri Shri Tridandi SwamiJi Maharaj,
 
 
 

Indian Hindu monks
20th-century Hindu philosophers and theologians
Hindu revivalists
1962 births
1999 deaths